Saint Buriana (or Berriona, Beriana or Beryan) was a 6th-century Irish saint, a hermit in St Buryan, near Penzance, Cornwall. Baring-Gould identifies her with the Irish Saint Bruinsech.

She is said to have been the daughter of an Irish king and travelled to Cornwall from Ireland as a missionary to convert the local people to Christianity. According to the Exeter Calendar of Martyrology Buriana was the daughter of a Munster chieftain. One legend tells how she cured the paralysed son of King Geraint of Dumnonia. Buriana ministered from a chapel on the site of the parish church at St Buryan.

Buriana's feast day is 1 May.

References

External links

 
 

6th-century Christian saints
Medieval Irish saints of Cornwall
6th-century Irish people
Female saints of medieval Ireland
Irish expatriates in England
Irish princesses
Medieval Irish saints
6th-century Irish women